Delta Omega is the honorary society for studies in public health, founded at the Johns Hopkins University Bloomberg School of Public Health.

History 
Delta Omega was founded in 1924 by two graduate students at the Johns Hopkins University Bloomberg School of Public Health. The Founders were: 
 Dr. Edgar Erskine Hume
 Dr. Claude W. Mitchell

Hume was a member of the Army Medical Corps from 1916 to 1951, and had already served overseas fighting Typhus epidemics in Siberia, Russia and in Naples, Italy. Mitchell was an Assistant Surgeon in the United States Public Health Service for approximately a decade. Later, he went into private medical practice with a 50 year career in Silver Spring, Maryland.

The ideal for Delta Omega came while sharing the daily commute between Baltimore and Washington. Both men sought to elevate the relatively young profession of public health to a level similar to other professions, and as such, that it should have a fraternity of its own. Hume was the first to insist that the fraternity be honorary in nature, and while Mitchell had originally suggested a social basis he soon agreed with his friend that the groups should be formed as an honor society. They consulted with members of other fraternities, and health experts of other fields. A group of seventeen students, one faculty member and one alumnus were chosen to become the charter members of the Johns Hopkins chapter. This group immediately formed committees to work out the constitution and symbolism.

Expansion began within the first year. Upon return from the summer recess, Hume reported success around the East coast, while Richard Bolt, a charter member, worked to organize groups in the West.  By the  meeting, chapters were approved at Harvard (Beta chapter) and MIT (Gamma chapter).  Soon, these would be followed by Michigan (Delta chapter) and Yale (Epsilon chapter). Expansion and growth continued quickly in spite of some growing pains due to the fast pace. The first California chapter, at the University of California (Zeta chapter) effectively spanned the nation by March 1926.

Delta Omega's activities were severely constrained during WWII, and were fully suspended between 1942 and 1944 because of wartime priorities. However, additional pressure came from organizational disagreements. At the time, Delta Omega offered membership only after completion of a year of residency, i.e.: after the undergrad and medical school years. This effectively resulted in control of the society becoming vested in faculty membership. Further, at Johns Hopkins, the activities of the fraternity were in some cases duplicative to those offered by the school itself. A debate ensued concerning the fact that some members, soon upon election, would resign from the practice of public health on an official level to go into private practice. In fact, Founder Mitchell, who had led Alpha chapter, resigned from his leadership position when he left for private practice. The result of this debate, explained further in the Fraternity's History, was to suspend operations at Alpha chapter, which would not resume at the school until 1978. The other chapters sputtered along. In 1948 a revitalization was sparked, but it took time, and some chapters did not re-emerge. The lecture series was expanded in the 1960s and 1970s. But it appears that it took the revitalization of Alpha chapter in 1978 to spark a new round of expansion that continues to the present day.

Currently, there are over 110 chapters with over 20,000 members throughout the United States, Puerto Rico, the Caribbean, Beirut, and Taiwan.
The society's mission is to promote excellence in contributing to the field of public health and advancing the health of people in every aspect, both in the United States and internationally.

Membership 
Membership in Delta Omega reflects the dedication of an individual to quality in the field of public health and to protection and advancement of the health of all people. Election to the society is based on outstanding performance – scholarship in students, teaching and research in faculty members, and community service in alumni.  Election to membership in Delta Omega is intended, not only to recognize merit, but also, to encourage further excellence in, and devotion to, public health work.

Each chapter must be associated with a Council on Education for Public Health (CEPH)- accredited school and is limited to inducting no more than 20% of the graduating student body, and 10% of undergraduates. GPA requirements are up to each chapter; historically, each inductee has been the top 25% of their class for academic performance. Public health faculty and alumni may also be inducted, but no more than 3% of faculty may be inducted from one program.

Honorary members 
In addition to the regularly elected members, chapters and the national executive board invite persons possessing exceptional qualifications, who have attained meritorious national or international distinction in the field to become honorary members of the society.  These members include:

Activities 
The National Office of Delta Omega conducts yearly activities in addition to the individual chapters.  Most importantly an annual business meeting is held each year in conjunction with the meeting of the American Public Health Association (APHA).  During the meeting the Delta Omega National Council, consisting of representatives from the chapters, meet to discuss initiatives and activities on a national and chapter level.

In addition to the annual business meeting, Delta Omega hosts a national student poster competition, honoring exceptional student research, and a national curriculum award, to honor innovative public health curricula.  Each year the selected poster presenters are given the opportunity to present their award-winning research at the APHA annual meeting.  The curriculum award winners present their work at the APHA annual meeting as well as in front of the Delta Omega National Council.  Chapters also conduct a variety of activities throughout the year on their campus and in their communities including; scholarship competitions, research awards, socials, lectures, community service projects and many others.

Publications 
Delta Omega values the advancement of public health education, practice and research and has therefore taken on an initiative to preserve Public Health Classics.  For the past decade, the society has sought to preserve and promote public health history by identifying and reprinting classic works in public health.  Classics may be books, scientific journal articles, technical reports, legislation or other written publications or multi-media productions.  The classics are selected for their historical value and significant contribution to the profession and science of public health.  These documents are usually out of print or not widely available in libraries.  Delta Omega places the classics on its Web site to make them freely available to all members.

Chapters 
Delta Omega has chartered 122 chapters, most of which remain active.  Active chapters are noted in bold, inactive chapters noted in italics.

See also 
 Professional degrees of public health
 Professional Further Education in Clinical Pharmacy and Public Health

References

External links 
Delta Omega Honorary Society in Public Health
Johns Hopkins University Bloomberg School of Public Health – Alpha Chapter
University of Miami Department of Public Health Sciences - Beta Sigma Chapter
Tulane University School of Public Health and Tropical Medicine – Eta Chapter
University of South Carolina Arnold School of Public Health – Mu Chapter
University of Pittsburgh Graduate School of Public Health – Omicron Chapter
San Diego State University Graduate School of Public Health – Sigma Chapter
The George Washington University School of Public Health - Omega Chapter
West Virginia University School of Public Health- Gamma Mu Chapter
University of Minnesota School of Public Health - Pi Chapter

Delta Omega
Delta Omega
Student organizations established in 1924
Health education organizations